George Davie may refer to:

 George Elder Davie (1912–2007), Scottish philosopher
 George Davie (footballer) (1864–?), English footballer
 George M. Davie (1848–1900), American lawyer and poet